Jean-Paul Corbineau (26 August 1948 – 16 December 2022) was a French singer-songwriter. He was a founding member of the band Tri Yann.

Biography

In 1966, he performed in Brittany with  under the name "Les Classic's" and singing folk songs by the likes of Graeme Allwright and Hugues Aufray.

In 1970,  joined Chocun and Corbineau and the group Tri Yann was formed. They called themselves "trois Jean de Nantes". Their first performance came in December 1970 with Corbineau playing the acoustic guitar, percussion, harmonica, and spoons.

Prior to becoming a professional musician, Corbineau worked as a produce grocer at hypermarket chain  in Saint-Herblain. In December 1972, when Tri Yann performed at the Olympia in an opening act for Juliette Gréco, he was still working at the store.

In January 2000, the three members of Tri Yann were named Knights of the Ordre des Arts et des Lettres.

Corbineau died of leukemia in Nantes, on 16 December 2022, at the age of 74.

Discography

La Chanson de Lola (1984)
La Muraille (1984)

References

External Links
 
 

1948 births
2022 deaths
French male singer-songwriters
Musicians from Nantes
20th-century French male singers
21st-century French male singers
Chevaliers of the Ordre des Arts et des Lettres
Deaths from leukemia
Deaths from cancer in France